True is a surname. Notable people with the surname include:
 Alexander True (born 1997), Danish professional ice hockey centre
 Alfred Charles True (1853-1929), American educator and agriculturist
 Allen Tupper True (1881-1955), American artist

 Arnold E. True (1901-1979), American naval officer
 Arthur L. True (1874-1952), American politician
 Ben True (born 1985), American track and field and cross-country athlete
 Bobby True (born 1977), Liberian middle-distance runner
 Charles Kittredge True (1809-1878), American clergyman
 Clarence True (1860-1928), American architect
 David True (born 1942), American painter
 Delbert Leroy True (1923-2001), merican archaeologist
 Diemer True (born 1946), American politician
 Everett True (born 1961), British music journalist
 Frederick W. True (born 1858-1941), American biologist
 Jacqui True born (1858-1941), political scientist and expert in gender studies
 James True (1880–1946), critic of the administration of Franklin Delano Roosevelt
 John M. True (1838–1921), Wisconsin politician
 Katie True (born 1941), merican politician
 Laurel True (born 1968), American artist
 Margaret Tupper True (1858–1926), American educator
 Marion True (born 1948), American curator
 Micah True (1953–2012), American ultrarunner
 Philip True (1948–1998), American foreign correspondent
 Rachel True (born 1966), American actress
 Reiko True (born 1933), Japanese American psychologist
 Ronald True (1891-1951), English murderer
 Sarah True (born 1981), American athlete who competes in triathlon